Doric or Dorian, also known as West Greek, was a group of Ancient Greek dialects; its varieties are divided into the Doric proper and Northwest Doric subgroups. Doric was spoken in a vast area, including northern Greece (Acarnania, Aetolia, Epirus, western and eastern Locris, Phocis, Doris, and possibly ancient Macedonia), most of the Peloponnese (Achaea, Elis, Messenia, Laconia, Argolid, Aegina, Corinth, and Megara), the southern Aegean (Kythira, Milos, Thera, Crete, Karpathos, and Rhodes), as well as the colonies of some of the aforementioned regions, in Cyrene, Magna Graecia, the Black Sea, the Ionian Sea and the Adriatic Sea. It was also spoken in the Greek sanctuaries of Dodona, Delphi, and Olympia, as well as at the four Panhellenic festivals; the Isthmian, Nemean, Pythian, and Olympic Games.

By Hellenistic times, under the Achaean League, an Achaean Doric koine appeared, exhibiting many peculiarities common to all Doric dialects, which delayed the spread of the Attic-based Koine Greek to the Peloponnese until the 2nd century BC. The only living descendant of Doric is the Tsakonian language which is still spoken in Greece today; though critically endangered, with only a few hundred – mostly elderly – fluent speakers left.

It is widely accepted that Doric originated in the mountains of Epirus in northwestern Greece, the original seat of the Dorians. It was expanded to all other regions during the Dorian invasion (c. 1150 BC) and the colonisations that followed. The presence of a Doric state (Doris) in central Greece, north of the Gulf of Corinth, led to the theory that Doric had originated in northwest Greece or maybe beyond in the Balkans. The dialect's distribution towards the north extends to the Megarian colony of Byzantium and the Corinthian colonies of Potidaea, Epidamnos, Apollonia and Ambracia; there, it further added words to what would become the Albanian language, probably via traders from a now-extinct Illyrian intermediary. In the north, local epigraphical evidence includes the decrees of the Epirote League, the Pella curse tablet, three additional lesser known Macedonian inscriptions (all of them identifiable as Doric), numerous inscriptions from a number of Greek colonies. Furthermore, there is an abundance of place names used to examine features of the northern Doric dialects. Southern dialects, in addition to numerous inscriptions, coins, and names, have also provided much more literary evidence through authors such as Alcman, Pindar, and Archimedes of Syracuse, among others, all of whom wrote in Doric. There are also ancient dictionaries that have survived; notably the one by Hesychius of Alexandria, whose work preserved many dialectal words from throughout the Greek-speaking world.

Varieties

Doric proper
Where the Doric dialect group fits in the overall classification of ancient Greek dialects depends to some extent on the classification. Several views are stated under Greek dialects. The prevalent theme of most views listed there is that Doric is a subgroup of West Greek. Some use the terms Northern Greek or Northwest Greek instead. The geographic distinction is only verbal and ostensibly is misnamed: all of Doric was spoken south of "Southern Greek" or "Southeastern Greek."

Be that as it may, "Northern Greek" is based on a presumption that Dorians came from the north and on the fact that Doric is closely related to Northwest Greek. When the distinction began is not known. All the "northerners" might have spoken one dialect at the time of the Dorian invasion; certainly, Doric could only have further differentiated into its classical dialects when the Dorians were in place in the south. Thus West Greek is the most accurate name for the classical dialects.

Tsakonian, a descendant of Laconian Doric (Spartan), is still spoken on the southern Argolid coast of the Peloponnese, in the modern prefectures of Arcadia and Laconia. Today it is a source of considerable interest to linguists, and an endangered dialect.

Laconian

Laconian was spoken by the population of Laconia in the southern Peloponnese and also by its colonies, Taras and Herakleia in Magna Graecia. Sparta was the seat of ancient Laconia.

Laconian is attested in inscriptions on pottery and stone from the seventh century BC. A dedication to Helen dates from the second quarter of the seventh century. Taras was founded in 706 and its founders must already have spoken Laconic.

Many documents from the state of Sparta survive, whose citizens called themselves Lacedaemonians after the name of the valley in which they lived. Homer calls it "hollow Lacedaemon", though he refers to a pre-Dorian period. The seventh century Spartan poet Alcman used a dialect that some consider to be predominantly Laconian. Philoxenus of Alexandria wrote a treatise On the Laconian dialect.

Argolic
Argolic was spoken in the thickly settled northeast Peloponnese at, for example, Argos, Mycenae, Hermione, Troezen, Epidaurus, and as close to Athens as the island of Aegina. As Mycenaean Greek had been spoken in this dialect region in the Bronze Age, it is clear that the Dorians overran it but were unable to take Attica. The Dorians went on from Argos to Crete and Rhodes.

Ample inscriptional material of a legal, political and religious content exists from at least the sixth century BC.

Corinthian

Corinthian was spoken first in the isthmus region between the Peloponnesus and mainland Greece; that is, the Isthmus of Corinth. The cities and states of the Corinthian dialect region were Corinth, Sicyon, Archaies Kleones, Phlius, the colonies of Corinth in western Greece: Corcyra, Leucas, Anactorium, Ambracia and others, the colonies in and around Italy: Syracuse, Sicily and Ancona, and the colonies of Corcyra: Dyrrachium, and Apollonia. The earliest inscriptions at Corinth date from the early sixth century BC. They use a Corinthian epichoric alphabet. (See under Attic Greek.)

Corinth contradicts the prejudice that Dorians were rustic militarists, as some consider the speakers of Laconian to be. Positioned on an international trade route, Corinth played a leading part in the re-civilizing of Greece after the centuries of disorder and isolation following the collapse of Mycenaean Greece.

Northwest Doric
The Northwest Doric (or "Northwest Greek", with "Northwest Doric" now considered more accurate so as not to distance the group from Doric proper) group is closely related to Doric proper, while sometimes there is no distinction between Doric and the Northwest Doric. Whether it is to be considered a part of the southern Doric Group or the latter a part of it or the two considered subgroups of West Greek, the dialects and their grouping remain the same. West Thessalian and Boeotian  had come under a strong Northwest Doric influence.

While Northwest Doric is generally seen as a dialectal group, dissenting views exist, such as that of Méndez-Dosuna, who argues that Northwest Doric is not a proper dialectal group but rather merely a case of areal dialectal convergence. Throughout the Northwest Doric area, most internal differences did not hinder mutual understanding, though Filos, citing Bubenik, notes that there were certain cases where a bit of accommodation may have been necessary.

The earliest epigraphic texts for Northwest Doric date to the 6th–5th century BC. These are thought to provide evidence for Northwest Doric features, especially the phonology and morphophonology, but most of the features thus attributed to Northwest Doric are not exclusive to it. The Northwest Doric dialects differ from the main Doric Group dialects in the below features:
 ar for er:   amara /Dor. amera/Att. hêmera (day), Elean wargon for Doric wergon and Attic ergon (work)
 Dative singular  in -oi instead of -ôi:  ,  Doric  , Attic  (to Asclepius)
 Middle participle in -eimenos instead of -oumenos

Four or five dialects of Northwestern Doric are recognised.

Phocian
This dialect was spoken in Phocis and in its main settlement, Delphi. Because of that it is also cited as Delphian. Plutarch says that Delphians pronounce b in the place of p ( for )

Locrian
Locrian Greek is attested in two locations:
 Ozolian Locris, along the northwest coast of the Gulf of Corinth around Amfissa (earliest c. 500 BC);
 Opuntian Locris, on the coast of mainland Greece opposite northwest Euboea, around Opus.

Elean
The dialect of Elis (earliest c. 600 BC) is considered, after Aeolic Greek, one of the most difficult for the modern reader of epigraphic texts.

Epirote

Spoken at the Dodona oracle, (earliest c. 550–500 BC) firstly under control of the Thesprotians; later organized in the Epirote League (since c. 370 BC).

Ancient Macedonian
Most scholars maintain that ancient Macedonian was a Greek dialect, probably of the Northwestern Doric group in particular. Olivier Masson, in his article for The Oxford Classical Dictionary, talks of "two schools of thought": one rejecting "the Greek affiliation of Macedonian" and preferring "to treat it as an Indo-European language of the Balkans" of contested affiliation (examples are Bonfante 1987, and Russu 1938); the other favouring "a purely Greek nature of Macedonian as a northern Greek dialect" with numerous adherents from the 19th century and on (Fick 1874; Hoffmann 1906; Hatzidakis 1897 etc.; Kalleris 1964 and 1976).

Masson himself argues with the largely Greek character of the Macedonian onomastics and sees Macedonian as "a Greek dialect, characterised by its marginal position and by local pronunciations" and probably most closely related to the dialects of the Greek North-West (Locrian, Aetolian, Phocidian, Epirote). Brian D. Joseph acknowledges the closeness of Macedonian to Greek (even contemplating to group them into a "Hellenic branch" of Indo-European), but retains that "[t]he slender evidence is open to different interpretations, so that no definitive answer is really possible".  Johannes Engels has pointed to the Pella curse tablet, written in Doric Greek: "This has been judged to be the most important ancient testimony to substantiate that Macedonian was a north-western Greek and mainly a Doric dialect". Miltiades Hatzopoulos has suggested that the Macedonian dialect of the 4th century BC, as attested in the Pella curse tablet, was a sort of Macedonian ‘koine’ resulting from the encounter of the idiom of the ‘Aeolic’-speaking populations around Mount Olympus and the Pierian Mountains with the Northwest Greek-speaking Argead Macedonians hailing from Argos Orestikon, who founded the kingdom of Lower Macedonia. However, according to Hatzopoulos, B. Helly expanded and improved his own earlier suggestion and presented the hypothesis of a (North-)‘Achaean’  substratum extending as far north as the head of the Thermaic Gulf, which had a continuous relation, in prehistoric times both in Thessaly and Macedonia, with the Northwest Greek-speaking populations living on the other side of the Pindus mountain range, and contacts became cohabitation  when the Argead Macedonians completed their wandering from Orestis to Lower Macedonia in the 7th c. BC. According to this hypothesis, Hatzopoulos concludes that the Macedonian Greek dialect of the historical period, which is attested in inscriptions, is a sort of koine resulting from the interaction and the influences of various elements, the most important of which are the North-Achaean substratum, the Northwest Greek idiom of the Argead Macedonians, and the Thracian and Phrygian adstrata.

Achaean Doric
Achaean Doric most probably belonged to the Northwest Doric group. It was spoken in Achaea in the northwestern Peloponnese, on the islands of Cephalonia and Zakynthos in the Ionian Sea, and in the Achaean colonies of Magna Graecia in Southern Italy (including Sybaris and Crotone). This strict Doric dialect was later subject to the influence of mild Doric spoken in Corinthia. It survived until 350 BC.

Achaean Doric koine
By Hellenistic times, under the Achaean League, an Achaean Doric koine appeared, exhibiting many peculiarities common to all Doric dialects, which delayed the spread of the Attic-based Koine Greek to the Peloponnese until the 2nd century BC.

Northwest Doric koine

The Northwest Doric koine refers to a supraregional North-West common variety that emerged in the third and second centuries BC, and was used in the official texts of the Aetolian League. Such texts have been found in W. Locris, Phocis, and Phtiotis, among other sites. It contained a mix of native Northwest Doric dialectal elements and Attic forms. It was apparently based on the most general features of Northwest Doric, eschewing less common local traits.

Its rise was driven by both linguistic and non-linguistic factors, with non-linguistic motivating factors including the spread of the rival Attic-Ionic koine after it was recruited by the Macedonian state for administration, and the political unification of a vast territories by the Aetolian League and the state of Epirus. The Northwest Doric koine was thus both a linguistic and a political rival of the Attic-Ionic koine.

Phonology

Vowels

Long a
Proto-Greek long *ā is retained as ā, in contrast to Attic developing a long open ē (eta) in at least some positions.
 Doric gā mātēr ~ Attic gē mētēr 'earth mother'

Compensatory lengthening of e and o
In certain Doric dialects (Severe Doric), *e and *o lengthen by compensatory lengthening or contraction to eta or omega, in contrast to Attic ei and ou (spurious diphthongs).
 Severe Doric -ō ~ Attic -ou (second-declension genitive singular)
 -ōs ~ -ous (second-declension accusative plural)
 -ēn ~ -ein (present, second aorist infinitive active)

Contraction of a and e
Contraction: Proto-Greek *ae > Doric ē (eta) ~ Attic ā.

Synizesis
Proto-Greek *eo, *ea > some Doric dialects' io, ia.

Proto-Greek *a
Proto-Greek short *a > Doric short a ~ Attic e in certain words.
 Doric hiaros, Artamis ~ Attic hieros 'holy', Artemis

Consonants

Proto-Greek *-ti
Proto-Greek *-ti is retained (assibilated to  -si in Attic).
 Doric phāti ~ Attic phēsi 'he says' (3rd sing. pres. of athematic verb)
 legonti ~ legousi 'they say' (3rd pl. pres. of thematic verb)
 wīkati ~ eikosi 'twenty'
 triākatioi ~ triākosioi 'three hundred'

Proto-Greek *ts
Proto-Greek *ts > -ss- between vowels. (Attic shares the same development, but further shortens the geminate to -s-.)
 Proto-Greek *métsos > Doric messos ~ Attic mesos 'middle' (from Proto-Indo-European *médʰyos, compare Latin medius)

Digamma
Initial *w (ϝ) is preserved in earlier Doric (lost in Attic).
 Doric woikos ~ Attic oikos 'house' (from Proto-Indo-European *weyḱ-, *woyḱ-, compare Latin vīcus 'village')
Literary texts in Doric and inscriptions from the Hellenistic age have no digamma.

Accentuation
For information on the peculiarities of Doric accentuation, see .

Morphology

Numeral tetores ~ Attic tettares, Ionic tesseres "four".

Ordinal prātos ~ Attic–Ionic prōtos "first".

Demonstrative pronoun tēnos "this" ~ Attic–Ionic (e)keinos

t for h (from Proto-Indo-European s) in article and demonstrative pronoun.
 Doric toi, tai; toutoi, tautai
 ~ Attic-Ionic hoi, hai; houtoi, hautai.

Third person plural, athematic or root aorist -n ~ Attic -san.
 Doric edon ~ Attic–Ionic edosan

First person plural active -mes ~ Attic–Ionic -men.

Future -se-ō ~ Attic -s-ō.
 prāxētai (prāk-se-etai) ~ Attic–Ionic prāxetai

Modal particle ka ~ Attic–Ionic an.
 Doric ai ka, ai de ka, ai tis ka ~ ean, ean de, ean tis

Temporal adverbs in -ka ~ Attic–Ionic -te.
 hoka, toka

Locative adverbs in -ei ~ Attic/Koine -ou.
 teide, pei.

Future tense
The aorist and future of verbs in -izō, -azō has x (versus Attic/Koine s).
 Doric agōnixato ~ Attic agōnisato "he contended"
Similarly k before suffixes beginning with t.

Glossary

Common
  aigades  (Attic  aiges) "goats"
  aiges (Attic  kymata) "waves"
  halia   (Attic  ekklēsia) "assembly" (Cf. Heliaia)
  brykainai  (Attic  hiereiai) "priestesses"
  bryketos (Attic  brygmos,  brykēthmos) "chewing, grinding, gnashing with the teeth"
   damiorgoi (Attic  archontes) "high officials". Cf. Attic  dēmiourgos "public worker for the people (dēmos), craftsman, creator"; Hesychius  "prostitutes". Zamiourgoi Elean.
  Elôos Hephaestus 
  karrōn  (Attic  kreittōn) "stronger" (Ionic kreissōn, Cretan kartōn )
  korygēs  (Attic  kēryx) "herald, messenger"  (Aeolic karoux)
  laios (Homeric, Attic and Modern Greek  aristeros) "left".Cretan:  laia, Attic aspis  shield, Hesych.  laipha  laiba, because the shield was held with the left hand. Cf.Latin:laevus
  laia (Attic, Modern Greek  leia) "prey"
  le(i)ō (Attic  ethelō) "will"
  oinōtros "vine pole" (: Greek  oinos "wine"). Cf.  Oenotrus
  mogionti (Ionic  pyressousi) "they are on fire, have fever" (= Attic  mogousi "they suffer, take pains to")
  myrmēdônes (Attic  myrmēkes) "ants". Cf. Myrmidons
  optillos or optilos 'eye' (Attic ophthalmos)  (Latin oculus) (Attic optikos of sight, Optics)
  paomai (Attic  ktaomai) "acquire"
  rhapidopoios poet, broiderer, pattern-weaver, boot-maker (rhapis needle for Attic rhaphis)
  skana (Attic skênê) tent, stage, scene) (Homeric klisiê) (Doric skanama encampment)
  tanthalyzein (Attic  tremein) "to tremble"
  tunē or tounē 'you nominative' (Attic συ) dative  teein  (Attic  soi)
  chanaktion  (Attic  mōron)(chan goose)

Doric proper

Argolic
  Ballacrades title of Argive athletes on a feast-day (Cf.achras wild pear-tree)
  Daulis mimic festival at Argos (acc. Pausanias 10.4.9 daulis means thicket) (Hes.daulon fire log)
  droon  strong (Attic ischyron, dynaton)
  kester youngman (Attic neanias)
  kyllarabis discus and gymnasium at Argos
  semalia ragged, tattered garments Attic rhakē, cf. himatia clothes)
  ôbea eggs  (Attic  ôa )

Cretan
  agela "group of boys in the Cretan agōgē". Cf. Homeric Greek  agelē "herd" (Cretan apagelos not yet received in agelê, boy under 17)
  adnos holy, pure (Attic  hagnos) (Ariadne)
  aWtos (Attic autos) Hsch. aus 
  akaralegs (Attic skelê)
  hamakis once (Attic hapax)
  argetos juniper, cedar (Attic arkeuthos)
  auka power  (Attic alkê)
  aphrattias strong
  balikiôtai Koine synepheboi (Attic hêlikiotai 'age-peers' of the same age hêlikia)
  britu sweet  (Attic glyku)
  damioô, Cretan and Boeotian.  for Attic zêmioô to damage, punish, harm
  dampon first milk curdled by heating over embers (Attic puriephthon, puriatê)
  dôla ears (Attic ôta) (Tarentine ata)
  Welchanos for Cretan Zeus and Welchanios, Belchanios, Gelchanos (Elchanios Cnossian month)
  wergaddomai I work (Attic ergazomai)
  Wêma garment (Attic heima)  (Aeolic emma) (Koine (h)immation)(Cf.Attic amphi-ennumi I dress, amph-iesis clothing)
  ibên wine  (Dialectal  Woînos Attic oinos) (accusative  ibêna)
  itton one (Attic hen )
  karanô goat
  kosmos and kormos archontes in Crete, body of kosmoi (Attic  order, ornament, honour, world - kormos trunk of a tree)
  kypheron, kuphê head (Attic kephalê)
  malkenis  (Attic parthenos) Hsch: malakinnês.
  othrun mountain (Attic oros) (Cf.Othrys)
  rhyston spear
  seipha darkness (Attic zophos, skotia) (Aeolic dnophos)
  speusdos title of Cretan officer (Cf.speudô speus- rush)
  tagana (Attic tauta) these things
  tiros  summer  (Homeric, Attic theros)
  tre you, accusative ( Attic se )

Laconian
  abêr storeroom 
  awôr dawn (Attic ἠώς êôs)  (Latin aurora)
  adda  need, deficiency (Attic endeia) Aristophanes of Byzantium(fr. 33)
  addauon dry (i.e. azauon) or addanon (Attic xêron)
  aikouda (Attic aischunē) 
  haimatia blood-broth, Spartan Melas Zomos Black soup) (haima haimatos blood)
  aïtas (Attic  erōmenos) "beloved boy (in a pederastic relationship)"
  akkor tube, bag (Attic askos)
  akchalibar bed (Attic skimpous)(Koine krabbatos)
  ambrotixas having begun, past participle(amphi or ana..+ ?) (Attic aparxamenos, aparchomai) (Doric -ixas for Attic -isas)
  ampesai (Attic amphiesai) to dress
  apaboidôr out of tune (Attic ekmelôs) (Cf.Homeric singer Aoidos) / emmelôs, aboidôr in tune
  apella (Attic  ekklēsia) "assembly in Sparta" (verb apellazein)
  arbylis (Attic  aryballos) (Hesychius: ἀρβυλίδα λήκυθον. Λάκωνες)
  attasi wake up, get up (Attic anastêthi)
  babalon imperative of  cry aloud, shout (Attic kraugason)
  bagaron (Attic χλιαρόν chliaron 'warm') (Cf. Attic φώγω phōgō 'roast') (Laconian word)
  bapha  broth (Attic zômos) (Attic  baphê dipping of red-hot iron in water  (Koine and Modern Greek βαφή vafi dyeing)
  weikati twenty (Attic εἴκοσι eikosi)
  bela sun and dawn Laconian (Attic helios Cretan abelios)
  bernômetha  Attic klêrôsômetha we will cast or obtain by lot (inf. berreai) (Cf.Attic meiresthai receive portion, Doric bebramena for heimarmenê, allotted by Moirai)
  beskeros bread (Attic artos)
  bêlêma hindrance, river dam (Laconian)
  bêrichalkon fennel (Attic marathos) ( bronze)
  bibasis Spartan dance for boys and girls
  bidyoi bideoi, bidiaioi also "officers in charge of the ephebes at Sparta"
  biôr almost, maybe (Attic) wihôr (ϝίὡρ)
  blagis spot (Attic kêlis)
  boua "group of boys in the Spartan agōgē"
  bo(u)agos "leader of a boua at Sparta"
  bullichês Laconian dancer  (Attic )
  bônêma speech (Homeric, Ionic eirêma eireo)  (Cf.Attic phônêma  sound, speech)
  gabergor labourer (ga earth wergon work) (Cf.geôrgos farmer)
  gaiadas citizens, people (Attic )
  gonar mother Laconian  (gonades children Eur. Med. 717)
  dabelos torch (Attic dalos)(Syracusan daelos, dawelos)(Modern Greek davlos) (Laconian   (Attic kauthêi) it should be burnt)
  diza goat (Attic aix) and Hera aigophagos Goat-eater in Sparta
  eirēn (Attic  ephēbos) "Spartan youth who has completed his 12th year"
  eispnēlas (Attic  erastēs) one who inspires love, a lover  (Attic eispneô  inhale, breathe)
  exôbadia (Attic  ;  ears)
   ephoroi (Attic  archontes) "high officials at Sparta". Cf. Attic   ephoros "overseer, guardian"
  Thoratês Apollon  thoraios containing the semen, god of growth and increase
  thrônax drone (Attic kêphên)
  kapha washing, bathing-tub (Attic loutêr) (Cf.skaphê basin, bowl)
  keloia (kelya, kelea also) "contest for boys and youths at Sparta"
  kirafox (Attic ) (Hsch kiraphos).
  myrtalis  Butcher's broom (Attic oxumursinê) (Myrtale real name of Olympias)
  pasor passion (Attic pathos)
  por leg, foot (Attic )
  pourdain restaurant (Koine mageirion) (Cf.purdalon, purodansion (from pyr fire hence pyre)
  salabar cook (Common Doric/Attic )
  sika 'pig' (Attic hus) and grôna female pig.
  siria safeness (Attic )
  psithômias ill, sick (Attic asthenês)  
  psilaker first dancer
  ôba  (Attic  kōmē) "village; one of five quarters of the city of Sparta"

Magna Graecia's Doric
  astyxenoi  Metics, Tarentine
  bannas king basileus, wanax, anax
  beilarmostai cavalry officers  Tarentine (Attic ilarchai) (ilē, squadron + Laconian harmost-)
  dostore 'you make' Tarentine (Attic  )
  Thaulia "festival of Tarentum",  thaulakizein 'to demand sth with uproar' Tarentine,   thaulizein "to celebrate like Dorians",  Thaulos "Macedonian Ares", Thessalian  Zeus Thaulios, Athenian   Zeus Thaulon, Athenian family  Thaulonidai
  rhaganon easy Thuriian (Attic ) (Aeolic )
  skytas 'back-side of neck' (Attic )
  tênês till Tarentine (Attic  )
  tryphômata  whatever are fed or nursed, children, cattle (Attic thremmata)
  huetis jug, amphora Tarentine (Attic hydris, hydria)(huetos rain)

North-West

Aetolian-Acarnanian
  agridion 'village' Aetolian (Attic chôrion)(Hesychius text:  dim. of agros  countryside, field)
  aeria fog Aetolian (Attic omichlê, aêr air)(Hsch.)
  kibba wallet, bag Aetolian (Attic  pêra) (Cypr. kibisis) (Cf.Attic  kibôtos  ark kibôtion box Suid. cites kibos)
  plêtomon Acarnanian old, ancient (Attic palaion,palaiotaton very old)

Delphic-Locrian
  deilomai  will, want Locrian, Delphian(Attic boulomai) (Coan  dêlomai) (Doric bôlomai) (Thessalian belloumai)
  Wargana female worker epithet for Athena (Delphic) (Attic Erganê) (Attic ergon work, Doric Wergon, Elean  Wargon
  Werrô go away Locrian (Attic errô) (Hsch. berrês fugitive, berreuô escape)
  Wesparioi Lokroi  Epizephyrian (Western) Locrians (Attic hesperios of evening, western, Doric wesperios) (cf. Latin Vesper)
  opliai places where the Locrians counted their cattle

Elean
  aWlaneôs  without fraud, honestly  IvO7 (Attic adolôs)(Hsch.alanes true)(Tarentinian alaneôs absolutely)
  amillux scythe (Attic drepanon) in accus.  (Boeotian amillakas wine)
  attamios unpunished  (Attic azêmios) from an earliest addamios (cf.Cretan, Boeotian damioô punish)
  babakoi cicadas Elean (Attic tettiges) (in Pontus babakoi frogs)
  baideios ready  (Attic hetoimos) (heteos fitness)
  beneoi Elean
  borsos  cross (Attic stauros)
  bra  brothers, brotherhood  (Cf.Attic phratra)
  bratana ladle (Attic torune) (Doric rhatana) (cf. Aeolic bradanizô brandish, shake off)
  deirêtai small birds (Macedonian  drêes or  drêges) (Attic strouthoi) (Hsc. trikkos small bird and king by Eleans)
  Wratra law, contract (Attic rhetra)
  seros  yesterday (Attic chthes)
  sterchana funeral feast (Attic perideipnon)
  philax young oak  (Macedonian ilax, Latin ilex (Laconian dilax ariocarpus, sorbus)(Modern Cretan azilakas Quercus ilex)
  phorbuta gums  (Attic oula) (Homeric pherbô feed, eat)

Epirotic
  anchôrixantas having transferred, postponed Chaonian (Attic metapherô, anaballô) (anchôrizo anchi near +horizô define and Doric x instead of Attic s) (Cf. Ionic anchouros neighbouring) not to be confused with Doric anchôreô Attic ana-chôreô go back, withdraw.
  akathartia  impurity (Attic/Doric akatharsia) (Lamelles Oraculaires 14)
  apotrachô run away (Attic/Doric apotrechô)
  aspaloi fishes Athamanian (Attic ichthyes) (Ionic chlossoi) (Cf.LSJ aspalia angling, aspalieus fisherman, aspalieuomai I angle metaph. of a lover, aspalisai: halieusai, sagêneusai. (hals sea)
  Aspetos  divine epithet of Achilles in Epirus (Homeric aspetos 'unspeakable, unspeakably great, endless' (Aristotle F 563 Rose; Plutarch, Pyrrhus 1; SH 960,4)
  gnôskô know (Attic gignôskô) (Ionic/Koine ginôskô) (Latin nōsco)(Attic gnôsis, Latin notio knowledge) (ref.Orion p. 42.17)
  diaitos (Hshc. judge kritês)  (Attic diaitêtês arbitrator) Lamelles Oraculaires 16
  eskichremen lend out   (Lamelles Oraculaires 8 of Eubandros) (Attic eis + inf. kichranai from chraomai use)
  Weidus knowing (Doric ) weidôs) (Elean  weizos) (Attic ) eidôs) (PIE *weid- "to know, to see", Sanskrit veda I know) Cabanes, L'Épire 577,50
  kaston wood Athamanian (Attic xylon from xyô scrape, hence xyston); Sanskrit 	kāṣṭham ("wood, timber, firewood") (Dialectical kalon wood, traditionally derived from kaiô burn kauston sth that can be burnt, kausimon fuel)
  lêïtêres  Athamanian priests with garlands Hes.text (LSJ: lêitarchoi public priests ) (hence Leitourgia
  manu small Athamanian (Attic mikron, brachu) (Cf. manon rare) (PIE *men- small, thin) (Hsch. banon thin) ( manosporos  thinly sown manophullos with small leaves Thphr.HP7.6.2-6.3)
  Naios or Naos epithet of Dodonaean Zeus (from the spring in the oracle) (cf. Naiades  and Pan Naios in Pydna SEG 50:622 (Homeric naô flow, Attic nama spring) (PIE *sna-)
  pagaomai 'wash in the spring' (of Dodona) (Doric paga Attic pêgê running water, fountain)
  pampasia  (to ask peri pampasias cliché phrase in the oracle) (Attic pampêsia  full property) (Doric paomai obtain)
  Peliganes or Peligones (Epirotan, Macedonian senators)
  prami do optative (Attic  prattoimi) Syncope (Lamelles Oraculaires 22)
  tine (Attic/Doric tini) to whom (Lamelles Oraculaires 7)
  trithutikon  triple sacrifice  tri + thuo(Lamelles Oraculaires 138)

Achaean Doric
  kairoteron (Attic: ἐνωρότερον enôroteron)  "earlier" (kairos time, enôros early cf. Horae)
  kephalidas (Attic: κόρσαι korsai) "sideburns" (kephalides was also an alternative for epalxeis 'bastions' in Greek proper)
  sialis (Attic: βλέννος blennos) (cf. blennorrhea) slime, mud (Greek sialon or sielon saliva, modern Greek σάλιο salio)

See also
 Griko language

References

Further reading
Bakker, Egbert J., ed. 2010. A companion to the Ancient Greek language. Oxford: Wiley-Blackwell.
Cassio, Albio Cesare. 2002. "The language of Doric comedy." In The language of Greek comedy. Edited by Anton Willi, 51–83. Oxford: Oxford University Press.
Colvin, Stephen C. 2007. A historical Greek reader: Mycenaean to the koiné. Oxford: Oxford University Press.
Horrocks, Geoffrey. 2010. Greek: A history of the language and its speakers. 2nd ed. Oxford: Wiley-Blackwell.
Palmer, Leonard R. 1980. The Greek language. London: Faber & Faber.

External links

 Doric Greek in Encyclopædia Britannica
 Grammar of the Greek Language ( M1 Doric by Benjamin Franklin Fisk (1844)
 The Elements of Greek Grammar  Doric by Richard Valpy, Charles Anthon (1834)
 Doric/Northwest Greek Brill's New Pauly Online 

 
Ancient Greek
Languages of ancient Macedonia
Greek
Languages of ancient Crete
Greek
Ancient Greek culture
Greek language
Languages of Greece
Languages attested from the 8th century BC
8th-century establishments in Europe
Languages extinct in the 1st century BC
1st-century BC disestablishments